William I or Wilhelm I (22 March 1797 – 9 March 1888) was King of Prussia from 2 January 1861 and German Emperor from 18 January 1871 until his death in 1888. A member of the House of Hohenzollern, he was the first head of state of a united Germany. He was de facto head of state of Prussia from 1858, when he became regent for his brother Frederick William IV, whose death three years later would make him king.

Under the leadership of William and his minister president Otto von Bismarck, Prussia achieved the unification of Germany and the establishment of the German Empire. Despite his long support of Bismarck as minister president, William held strong reservations about some of Bismarck's more reactionary policies, including his anti-Catholicism and tough handling of subordinates. In contrast to the domineering Bismarck, William was described as polite, gentlemanly and, while staunchly conservative, more open to certain classical liberal ideas than his grandson Wilhelm II, during whose reign he was known as Wilhelm the Great.

Early life and military career

As the second son of Louise of Mecklenburg-Strelitz and Prince Frederick William, himself son of King Frederick William II, William was not expected to ascend to the throne. His grandfather died the year he was born, at age 53, in 1797, and his father Frederick William III became king. At age twelve, his father appointed him an officer in the Prussian army. The year 1806 saw the defeat of Prussia by France and the end of the Holy Roman Empire.

William served in the army from 1814 onward. He was made a captain and won the Iron Cross for his actions at Bar-sur-Aube. The war and the fight against France left a lifelong impression on him, and he had a long-standing antipathy towards the French.

In 1815, William was promoted to major and commanded a battalion of the 1. Garderegiment. He fought under Gebhard Leberecht von Blücher at the Battles of Ligny and Waterloo. He became a diplomat, engaging in diplomatic missions after 1815. In 1817, he accompanied his sister Charlotte to Saint Petersburg,  when she married Emperor Nicholas I of Russia, becoming Empress Alexandra Feodorovna.

The next year, William was appointed inspector of the VII. and VIII. Army Corps. This made him a spokesman of the Prussian Army within the House of Hohenzollern. He argued in favour of a strong, well-trained, and well-equipped army. Army Corps.

Around this time, William became romantically linked with his cousin, Polish noblewoman Elisa Radziwill. In 1826, William was forced to break off the relationship by his father, who deemed it an inappropriate match. It is alleged that Elisa had an illegitimate daughter by William who was brought up by Joseph and Caroline Kroll, owners of the Kroll Opera House in Berlin, and was given the name Agnes Kroll. She married a Carl Friedrich Ludwig Dettman (known as "Louis") and emigrated to Sydney, Australia, in 1849. They had a family of three sons and two daughters. Agnes died in 1904.

In 1829, William married Princess Augusta, the daughter of Grand Duke Karl Friedrich of Saxe-Weimar-Eisenach and Maria Pavlovna, the sister of Nicholas I. Their marriage was outwardly stable, but not a very happy one.

In 1840 his older brother became King of Prussia. Since he had no children, William was first in line to succeed him to the throne and thus was given the title .

During the Revolutions of 1848, William successfully crushed a revolt in Berlin that was aimed at Frederick William IV. The use of cannons made him unpopular at the time and earned him the nickname  (Prince of Grapeshot). Indeed, he had to flee to England for a while, disguised as a merchant. He returned and helped to put down an uprising in Baden, where he commanded the Prussian army. In October 1849, he became governor-general of Rhineland and Westfalia, with a seat at the Electoral Palace in Koblenz.

William's opposition to liberal ideas gradually softened.

In 1854, the prince was raised to the rank of a field-marshal and made governor of the federal fortress of Mainz. In 1857 Frederick William IV suffered a stroke and became mentally disabled for the rest of his life. In January 1858, William became Prince Regent for his brother, initially only temporarily but after October on a permanent basis. Against the advice of his brother, William swore an oath of office on the Prussian constitution and promised to preserve it "solid and inviolable". William appointed a liberal, Karl Anton von Hohenzollern-Sigmaringen, as Minister President and thus initiated what became known as the "New Era" in Prussia, although there were conflicts between William and the liberal majority in the Landtag on matters of reforming the armed forces.

King

On 2 January 1861, Frederick William IV died and William ascended the throne as William I of Prussia. In July, a student from Leipzig attempted to assassinate William, but he was only lightly injured. Like Frederick I of Prussia, William travelled to Königsberg and there crowned himself at the Schlosskirche. William chose the anniversary of the Battle of Leipzig, 18 October, for this event, which was the first Prussian crowning ceremony since 1701 and the only crowning of a German king in the 19th century. William refused to comply with his brother's wish, expressed in Frederick William's last will, that he should abrogate the constitution.

William inherited a conflict between Frederick William and the liberal Landtag. He was considered to be politically neutral as he intervened less in politics than his brother. In 1862 the Landtag refused an increase in the military budget needed to pay for the already implemented reform of the army. This involved raising the peacetime army from 150,000 to 200,000 men and boost the annual number of new recruits from 40,000 to 63,000. However, the truly controversial part was the plan to keep the length of military service (raised in 1856 from two years) at three years. When his request, backed by his Minister of War Albrecht von Roon was refused, William first considered abdicating, but his son, the Crown Prince, advised strongly against it. Then, on the advice of Roon, William appointed Otto von Bismarck to the office of Minister President in order to force through the proposals. According to the Prussian constitution, the Minister President was responsible solely to the king, not to the Landtag. Bismarck, a conservative Prussian Junker and loyal friend of the king, liked to see his working relationship with William as that of a vassal to his feudal superior. Nonetheless, it was Bismarck who effectively directed the politics, domestic as well as foreign; on several occasions he gained William's assent by threatening to resign.

During his reign, William was the commander-in-chief of the Prussian forces in the Second Schleswig War against Denmark in 1864 and the Austro-Prussian War in 1866. After the latter was won by Prussia, William wanted to march on to Vienna and annex Austria, but was dissuaded from doing so by Bismarck and his son Crown Prince Frederick William. Bismarck wanted to end the war quickly, so as to allow Prussia to ally with Austria if it needed to at a later date; Frederick William was also appalled by the casualties and wanted a speedy end to hostilities. During a heated discussion, Bismarck threatened to resign if William continued to Vienna; Bismarck got his way. William had to content himself with becoming the de facto ruler of the northern two-thirds of Germany. Prussia annexed several of Austria's allies north of the Main, as well as Schleswig-Holstein. It also forced Saxe-Lauenburg into a personal union with Prussia (which became a full union in 1878).

In 1867, the North German Confederation was created as a federation (federally organised state) of the North German and Central German states under the permanent presidency of Prussia.  William assumed the  Bundespräsidium, the presidium of the Confederation; the post was a hereditary office of the Prussian crown. Not expressis verbis, but in function he was the head of state. Bismarck intentionally avoided a title such as Präsident as it sounded too republican. William became also the constitutional Bundesfeldherr, the commander of all federal armed forces. Via treaties with the South German states, he also became commander of their armies in times of war. In 1870, during the Franco-Prussian War, William was in command of all the German forces at the crucial Battle of Sedan.

German Emperor

During the Franco-Prussian War, the South German states joined the North German Confederation, which was reorganized as the German Empire (Deutsches Reich). The title of Bundespräsidium was amended with the title of German Emperor (Deutscher Kaiser). This was decided on by the legislative organs, the Reichstag and Bundesrat, and William agreed to this on 8 December in the presence of a Reichstag delegation. The new constitution and the title of Emperor came into effect on 1 January 1871.

William, however, hesitated to accept the constitutional title, as he feared that it would overshadow his own title as King of Prussia. He also wanted it to be Kaiser von Deutschland ("Emperor of Germany"), but Bismarck warned him that the South German princes and the Emperor of Austria might protest. William eventually—though grudgingly—relented and on 18 January, he was formally proclaimed as emperor in the Hall of Mirrors in the Palace of Versailles. The date was chosen as the coronation date of the first Prussian king in 1701. In the national memory, 18 January became the day of the foundation of the Empire (Reichsgründungstag), although it did not have a constitutional significance.

To many intellectuals, the coronation of William was associated with the restoration of the Holy Roman Empire. Felix Dahn wrote a poem, "Macte senex Imperator" (Hail thee, old emperor) in which he nicknamed William Barbablanca (whitebeard), a play on the name of the medieval emperor Frederick Barbarossa (redbeard). According to the King asleep in mountain legend, Barbarossa slept under the Kyffhäuser mountain until Germany had need of him. William I was thus portrayed as a second coming of Barbarossa. The Kyffhäuser Monument portrays both emperors.

In 1872, he arbitrated a boundary dispute between the United Kingdom and the United States, deciding in favor of the U.S. and placing the San Juan Islands of modern-day Washington within U.S. national territory, thus ending the 12-year bloodless Pig War.

In his memoirs, Bismarck describes William as an old-fashioned, courteous, infallibly polite gentleman and a genuine Prussian officer, whose good common sense was occasionally undermined by "female influences". This was a reference to William's wife, who had been educated by, among others Johann Wolfgang von Goethe and was intellectually superior to her husband. She was also at times very outspoken in her opposition to official policies as she was a liberal. William, however, had long been strongly opposed to liberal ideas. Despite possessing considerable power as Kaiser, William left the task of governing mostly to his chancellor, limiting himself to representing the state and approving Bismarck's every policy. In private he once remarked on his relationship with Bismarck: It is difficult to be emperor under such a chancellor.

Assassination attempts and Anti-Socialist laws
 
On 11 May 1878, a plumber named Emil Max Hödel failed in an assassination attempt on William in Berlin. Hödel used a revolver to shoot at the then 81-year-old Emperor, while he and his daughter, Princess Louise, paraded in their carriage on Unter den Linden. When the bullet missed, Hödel ran across the street and fired another round which also missed. In the commotion one of the individuals who tried to apprehend Hödel suffered severe internal injuries and died two days later. Hödel was seized immediately. He was tried, convicted, sentenced to death, and executed on 16 August 1878.

A second attempt to assassinate William I was made on 2 June 1878 by Dr. Karl Nobiling. As the Emperor drove past in an open carriage, the assassin fired two shots from a shotgun at him from the window of a house off the Unter den Linden. William was severely wounded and was rushed back to the palace. Nobiling shot himself in an attempt to commit suicide. While William survived this attack, the assassin died from his self-inflicted wound three months later.

Despite the fact that Hödel had been expelled from the Social Democratic Party, his actions were used as a pretext by Bismarck to ban the party. To do this, Bismarck partnered with Ludwig Bamberger, a Liberal, who had written on the subject of Socialism, "If I don't want any chickens, then I must smash the eggs." These attempts on William's life thus became the pretext for the institution of the Anti-Socialist Law, which was introduced by Bismarck's government with the support of a majority in the Reichstag on 18 October 1878, for the purpose of fighting the socialist and working-class movement. These laws deprived the Social Democratic Party of Germany of its legal status; prohibited all organizations, workers’ mass organizations and the socialist and workers’ press; decreed confiscation of socialist literature; and subjected Social-Democrats to reprisals. The laws were extended every 2–3 years. Despite the reprisals the Social Democratic Party increased its influence among the masses. Under pressure of the mass working-class movement the laws were repealed on 1 October 1890.

Later years and death

In August 1878, Russian Tsar Alexander II, William's nephew, wrote a letter (known as Ohrfeigenbrief) to him complaining about the treatment Russian interests had received at the Congress of Berlin. In response William, his wife Augusta, and his son the crown prince travelled to Russia (against the advice of Bismarck) to mend fences in face-to-face talks. However, by once again threatening to resign, Bismarck overcame the opposition of William to a closer alliance with Austria. In October, William agreed to the Dual Alliance (Zweibund) between Germany and Austria-Hungary, which was directed against Russia.

Another assassination attempt failed on 18 September 1883 when William unveiled the Niederwalddenkmal in Rüdesheim. A group of anarchists had prepared an attack using dynamite which failed due to the wet weather.

The Berlin Conference of 1884–85 organized by Otto von Bismarck can be seen as the formalization of the Scramble for Africa. Claiming much of the left-over territories in Africa and Oceania that were yet unclaimed, Germany managed to build the large German colonial empire.

Despite the assassination attempts and William's unpopular role in the 1848 uprising, he and his wife were very popular, especially in their later years. Many people considered them the personification of "the old Prussia" and liked their austere and simple lifestyle. William died on 9 March 1888 in Berlin after a short illness, less than two weeks before his 91st birthday. He was buried on 16 March at the Mausoleum at Park Charlottenburg. He was succeeded by his son Frederick who was already in an ill health himself (suffering from throat cancer). Frederick spent the 99 days of his reign fighting his illness before dying and being succeeded by his eldest son Wilhelm on 15 June.

To honour him a large number of memorials/statues were erected all over the country over the following years. The best known among them are the Kyffhäuser monument (1890–96) in Thuringia, the monument at Porta Westfalica (1896) and the mounted statue of William at the Deutsches Eck in Koblenz (1897). The statue next to the Stadtschloss, Berlin (1898) was melted down by the government of East Berlin in 1950.

From 1867 to 1918 more than 1,000 memorials to William I were constructed.

Issue
William and Augusta of Saxe-Weimar had two children:

Religion
William was a Lutheran member of the Evangelical State Church of Prussia's older Provinces. It was a United Protestant denomination, bringing together Reformed and Lutheran believers.

Titles, styles, honours and arms

His full title as king of Prussia was William, by the Grace of God, King of Prussia; Margrave of Brandenburg, Burgrave of Nuremberg, Count of Hohenzollern; Sovereign and Supreme Duke of Silesia and of the County of Glatz; Grand Duke of the Lower Rhine and of Posen; Duke of Saxony, of Westphalia, of Angria, of Pomerania, Lüneburg, Holstein and Schleswig, of Magdeburg, of Bremen, of Guelders, Cleves, Jülich and Berg, Duke of the Wends and the Kassubes, of Crossen, Lauenburg and Mecklenburg; Landgrave of Hesse and Thuringia; Margrave of Upper and Lower Lusatia; Prince of Orange; Prince of Rügen, of East Friesland, of Paderborn and Pyrmont, of Halberstadt, Münster, Minden, Osnabrück, Hildesheim, of Verden, Cammin, Fulda, Nassau and Moers; Princely Count of Henneberg; Count of Mark, of Ravensberg, of Hohenstein, Tecklenburg and Lingen, of Mansfeld, Sigmaringen and Veringen; Lord of Frankfurt.

Honours and awards

German decorations

Foreign decorationsStaatshandbuch für das Großherzogtum Sachsen / Sachsen-Weimar-Eisenach (1885), "Genealogie", p. 7

Ancestry

See also
 German Emperor
 List of monarchs of Prussia
 Berlin
 Germany
 Kamerun
 Togoland
 German South West Africa
 German New Guinea
 German East Africa
 German Samoa

References

Further reading

External links

 Archontology.org – William I
 Webpage of the House of Hohenzollern 
 
 
 

|-

 
German emperors
Kings of Prussia
1797 births
1888 deaths
19th-century German emperors
19th-century Kings of Prussia
19th-century viceregal rulers
Colonel generals of Prussia
Dukes of Saxe-Lauenburg
Protestant monarchs
Regents of Prussia
German people of the Franco-Prussian War
German Protestants
German landowners
House of Hohenzollern
Prussian Army personnel of the Napoleonic Wars
Military personnel from Berlin
Burials at the Charlottenburg Palace Park Mausoleum, Berlin
German Calvinist and Reformed Christians
1860s in Prussia
1870s in Germany
1870s in Prussia
1880s in Germany
1880s in Prussia
19th-century German people
19th-century Prussian military personnel
Shooting survivors
German Freemasons
German hunters

Recipients of the Grand Cross of the Iron Cross
Grand Crosses of the Military Order of Max Joseph
Grand Crosses of the Order of Saint Stephen of Hungary
Grand Croix of the Légion d'honneur
Recipients of the Order of the Netherlands Lion
Knights Grand Cross of the Military Order of William
3
3
3
Recipients of the Order of St. Anna, 1st class
Recipients of the Order of St. Vladimir, 1st class
Recipients of the Order of St. George of the First Degree
Knights of the Golden Fleece of Spain
Laureate Cross of Saint Ferdinand
Knights of the Order of Charles XIII
Honorary Knights Grand Cross of the Order of the Bath
Extra Knights Companion of the Garter
Recipients of the Military Merit Cross (Mecklenburg-Schwerin), 1st class
Grand Crosses of the Military Order of Maria Theresa
House of Hesse-Kassel
Recipients of the Gold Medal of Military Valor
Member of the Prussian National Assembly